Letheobia gracilis, also known as the gracile blind snake or Urungu beaked snake is a species of snake in the family Typhlopidae. It is endemic to Africa and is known from northern Zambia, western Tanzania, and southern Democratic Republic of the Congo.

References

Further reading
 Sternfeld, Richard. 1910. Neue Schlangen aus Kamerun, Abbessinien und Deutsch-Ostafrika. Mitteilungen aus dem Zoologischen Museum in Berlin 5: 67–70.

Letheobia
Snakes of Africa
Reptiles of the Democratic Republic of the Congo
Reptiles of Tanzania
Reptiles of Zambia
Reptiles described in 1910
Taxa named by Richard Sternfeld